Linus William Roache (born 1 February 1964) is a British actor. He is known for playing Executive ADA Michael Cutter in the NBC dramas Law & Order (2008–2010) and Law & Order: Special Victims Unit (2011–2012). More recently, Roache played Ecbert, King of Wessex in Vikings from 2014 to 2017.

He was nominated for a Golden Globe Award for playing Robert F. Kennedy in RFK (2002) and won a Satellite Award for Best Supporting Actor (TV) for his role as Ralph Wigram in The Gathering Storm (2002). His film appearances include Priest (1994), The Wings of the Dove (1997), Pandaemonium (2000), The Chronicles of Riddick (2004), Batman Begins (2005), Non-Stop (2014) and Mandy (2018). In 2018 and 2020 he had a recurring role in the final two seasons of Homeland.

Early life
Roache was born in Manchester, England, the son of Coronation Street actor William Roache and actress Anna Cropper. Roache was educated at Bishop Luffa School in Chichester, West Sussex, and at Rydal School in Colwyn Bay in north Wales. He studied acting at the Central School of Speech and Drama. He married actress Rosalind Bennett in Malvern Hills, Worcestershire, in 2002.

Career
In 1975 Roache appeared in Coronation Street playing Peter Barlow, the son of his father's character Ken Barlow. Roache is also a past member of the Royal Shakespeare Company.

In the 1990s Roache began a career in films while remaining active in television and on stage. In 1994 he took a leading role in Antonia Bird's Priest. In 1997, he starred opposite Helena Bonham Carter in the film The Wings of the Dove. In 2001, he won  the Evening Standard British Film Award for Best Actor, for his performance as Samuel Taylor Coleridge in the Julien Temple directed movie Pandaemonium alongside Samantha Morton.

In 2005, he played Thomas Wayne, father of Batman, in Batman Begins. On television he played Executive Assistant District Attorney Michael Cutter in two American series, Law & Order (2008–2010) and Law & Order: Special Victims Unit (2011–2012).

In June 2010 it was announced that he would return to play Laurence Cunningham alongside his father William Roache in Coronation Street. In July 2010 he was cast in the HBO pilot The Miraculous Year.

In April 2011 Roache was cast as the lead in the ITV miniseries Titanic, airing in March and April 2012 to coincide with the 100th anniversary of the sinking of the ship.

In February 2014 Roache debuted in season two of the TV series Vikings as Ecbert, King of Wessex.

He starred in seasons seven and eight of the TV series Homeland as David Wellington in 2017-2019.

Filmography

Film

Television

Selected theatre
 Tom Wingfield in The Glass Menagerie by Tennessee Williams. Directed by Ian Hastings at the Royal Exchange, Manchester. (1989)
 The title role in Richard II. Directed by James Macdonald at the Royal Exchange, Manchester.  (1993)

Awards and nominations

References

External links

1964 births
20th-century English male actors
21st-century English male actors
Living people
Alumni of the Royal Central School of Speech and Drama
English male child actors
English male film actors
English male Shakespearean actors
English male stage actors
English male television actors
Male actors from Manchester
People educated at Bishop Luffa School
People educated at Rydal Penrhos
Royal Shakespeare Company members